Mateh Kola may refer to:
 Mateh Kola, Babol
 Mateh Kola, Sari
 Mateh Kola, Savadkuh